Thomas Holme was Surveyor General of Pennsylvania.

Thomas Holme may also refer to:

Thomas Holme (MP), for City of York

See also
Thomas Holm (disambiguation)
Thomas Holmes (disambiguation)